Eucalyptus perangusta, commonly known as fine-leaved mallee, is a species of mallee that is endemic to a small area on the south coast of Western Australia. It has smooth bark, glossy green, linear leaves, flower buds in groups of seven or nine, creamy white flowers and short, barrel-shaped fruit.

Description
It has smooth, pale grey bark that is shed in thin, curly flakes. Flowering occurs between December and March and the flowers are creamy white.

Taxonomy
Eucalyptus perangusta was first formally described in 1988 by Ian Brooker in the journal Nuytsia from material collected near "Oldfield's Road, east of the Young River crossing" in 1983. The specific epithet (perangusta) is from Latin, meaning "very narrow".

Distribution and habitat
Fine-leaved mallee grows in heath on undulating sandplains in sandy soil, especially over gravel or clay. It is found in the Avon Wheatbelt, Esperance Plains, Jarrah Forest and Mallee biogeographic regions between Ravensthorpe, Newdegate and Salmon Gums.

Conservation status
This eucalypt is classified as "not threatened" by the Western Australian Government Department of Parks and Wildlife.

See also
List of Eucalyptus species

References

Eucalypts of Western Australia
Trees of Australia
perangusta
Myrtales of Australia
Plants described in 1988
Taxa named by Ian Brooker